Enstratius (formerly enStratus) was a cloud computing infrastructure management platform founded in Minneapolis in 2008. It was intended to address governance issues associated with deploying systems in public, private, and hybrid clouds.  
More than twenty public and private clouds are supported, as well as configuration management tools such as Chef and Puppet.  Enstratius supports both SaaS and on-premises deployment models.

Enstratius was headquartered in Eden Prairie, Minnesota, with remote workers across the United States, and offices in Auckland, New Zealand, and Edinburgh, Scotland. It was purchased by Dell in 2013 and ceased operations as a separate entity by 2016.

History 
The company was originally formed in 2008 as enStratus Networks, a spin-off of marketing software maker Valtira. The software forming the backbone of enStratus was a set of cloud management tools that Valtira had developed in support of its cloud operations. The company announced itself publicly at the MinneDemo conference in February 2009 and began accepting on-demand accounts. 
Co-founders were David Bagley and George Reese.

Enstratius moved from a focus purely on security to the wider problem of governance over multiple cloud computing environments. In 2010, Enstratius spun off part of its intellectual property as an open source project  hosted at  GitHub under the Apache license called Dasein Cloud. Dasein Cloud is a Java abstraction API that Enstratius uses to talk to the clouds it supports.

The company raised a Series A financing of $4.5 million in November 2011 from El Dorado Ventures, Vesbridge Partners, and Citrix.
In March 2013, enStratus Networks changed its name to Enstratius, Inc. 

In May 2013, the company was acquired by Dell.
Two weeks later, Dell discontinued its own cloud computing service.

In June 2016 Dell shifted the Enstratius product line to support-only. They continue to support customers, but are no longer selling this cloud management platform.

In November 2016, Dell Software became Quest_Software.

As of late 2019, www.enstratius.com redirected to a "Page Not Found" on Quest_Software support site.

Supported platforms

Compute
 Amazon Web Services
 Cloud Central
 GoGrid
 Rackspace
 ReliaCloud
 Terremark vCloud Express
 Joyent
 HP Cloud
 IBM SmartCloud Enterprise
 Dell OpenStack-powered Cloud

Storage
 Amazon Web Services
 AT&T Synaptic Storage
 Azure Services Platform
 Google
 Rackspace
 HP Cloud

Cloud
 EMC Atmos
 Citrix CloudStack
 Eucalyptus
 OpenStack
 vCloud
 vSphere

References

External links 
 Official site

Cloud computing providers
Cloud infrastructure
Cloud platforms
Cloud storage
Technology companies established in 2008
Software companies based in Minneapolis
Companies acquired by Dell
2013 mergers and acquisitions
Technology companies disestablished in 2016